Burhan Atak (27 January 1905 – 6 June 1987) was a Turkish former football player. He spent the entirety of his career with his hometown club, Galatasaray SK. He also represented Turkey on 10 occasions, including at the 1928 Summer Olympics.

Career
Atak was born in Istanbul and played his entire career as a defender for Galatasaray SK. Like many other Galatasaray SK players at that time, he was a student of the Galatasaray High School and started playing football at the Grand Cour of the Galatasaray High School.

He made his senior national team debut against Bulgaria on 12 September 1926 and scored his first and only goal against Romania on 15 April 1928.

Atak won the Istanbul Football League six times.

Career statistics

International goals

Honours

As player
 Galatasaray
 Istanbul Football League (6): 1921–22, 1924–25, 1925–26, 1926–27, 1928–29, 1930–31
 Istanbul Kupası: 1933

See also
List of one-club men

References

Turkish footballers
Galatasaray S.K. footballers
1905 births
1987 deaths
Footballers at the 1928 Summer Olympics
Olympic footballers of Turkey
Footballers from Istanbul
Galatasaray High School alumni
Association football defenders
Turkey international footballers